Glyphidocera lunata is a moth in the family Autostichidae. It was described by Adamski and Brown in 2001. It is found in Venezuela.

References

Moths described in 2001
Taxa named by David Adamski
Glyphidocerinae